John Ericksen (August 30, 1903 – October 17, 1985) was an American skier. He competed in the Nordic combined event at the 1932 Winter Olympics.

References

External links
 

1903 births
1985 deaths
American male Nordic combined skiers
Olympic Nordic combined skiers of the United States
Nordic combined skiers at the 1932 Winter Olympics
People from Arendal